The 2019 Bahamas Bowl was a college football bowl game played on December 20, 2019, with kickoff at 2:00 p.m. EST on ESPN. It was the 6th edition of the Bahamas Bowl, and the first of the 2019–20 bowl games concluding the 2019 FBS football season. Sponsored by the Chicago suburb of Elk Grove Village, Illinois, the game was officially known as the Makers Wanted Bahamas Bowl. Behind 173 rushing yards from Bulls running back Jaret Patterson, Buffalo defeated Charlotte, 31–9.

Teams
The game was played between the Charlotte 49ers from Conference USA (C–USA) and the Buffalo Bulls from the Mid-American Conference (MAC). This was the first time the Bulls and 49ers played against each other.

Buffalo Bulls

Buffalo entered the bowl with a 7–5 record (5–3 in conference). The Bulls finished their regular season in a three-way tie for second place in the East Division of the MAC. This was Buffalo's fourth appearance in a bowl game; they were 0–3 in prior bowls, most recently appearing in the 2018 Dollar General Bowl.

Charlotte 49ers

Charlotte entered the bowl with a 7–5 record (5–3 in conference). The 49ers finished their regular season in fourth place in the East Division of C–USA. This was Charlotte's first postseason game in school history.

Game summary

Statistics

References

External links

Game statistics at statbroadcast.com

Bahamas Bowl
Bahamas Bowl
Charlotte 49ers football bowl games
Buffalo Bulls football bowl games
December 2019 sports events in North America
Bahamas Bowl